Reventó (Break) is the eighth solo album by salsa singer Héctor Lavoe. It was released on 1985 under the label of Fania Records. It was produced by Jerry Masucci and Puchi Lavoe.

Reception 
Reventó has been called "a solid album in the classic New York salsa style". According to Lavoe's biographer Marc Shapiro, the album was critically acclaimed upon release, although "it was not hailed as a landmark or breakthrough Héctor Lavoe album"; he goes on to say that it further established Lavoe as a talented, legitimate singer.

Revento entered the Billboard Top Latin Albums chart (New York) on 15 June 1985 at position 12; it stayed in the charts until November that year.

Track listing
 "De Qué Tamaño Es Tu Amor"3:33
 "La Vida Es Bonita"4:11
 "Don Fulano de Tal"3:46
 "La Fama" 5:20
 "Déjala Que Siga"6:27
 "Cáncer"6:53
 "¿Por Qué No Puedo Ser Feliz?"4:23

Personnel
 Héctor Lavoe (lead vocals, backing vocals)
 Joe Torres, Isidro Infante (piano)
 Sal Cuevas (bass)
 Milton Cardona (congas, backing vocals)
 Pablo Rosario (bongo)
 John Andrews (timbales)
 Lewis Kahn, Leo Pineda (trombone)
 Héctor Casanova (maracas)
 Johnny Pacheco (güiro, flute solo in "Déjala que siga")
 Mario Andreola (guitar)
 Richie Ray (piano solo in "Cáncer")
 José Mangual (backing vocals) 
 Brenda Feliciano (Coro in "La vida es bonita"), 
 Juan Viloria Villarman "Juancho" (Coro in "¿Por qué no puedo ser feliz?")

Technical
 Jerry Masucci (production)
 Puchi Lavoe (production)

References 

1985 albums
Héctor Lavoe albums
Fania Records albums